"The Innkeeper's Wife" is a 1958 Christmas story, written by A. J. Cronin for The American Weekly.  The story is about the wife of the innkeeper in Bethlehem who had no room for Mary and Joseph to spend the night. It originally appeared in the December 21 issue before being printed in book form by Hearst Publishing and is accompanied by Ben Stahl's illustrations.

Characters:
 The Innkeeper 
 His wife 
 Mary & Joseph 
 Gabriel 
 Shepherds 
 Angels 
 Stars 
 Sheep 
 Cows 
 The Kings 
 Pages of the Kings 
 Travellers 
 Criers 

1958 short stories
1958 books
British short stories
Short stories by A. J. Cronin
Books by A. J. Cronin
Christmas short stories
Works originally published in The American Weekly